On December 16, 1960, a United Airlines Douglas DC-8 bound for Idlewild Airport (now John F. Kennedy International Airport) in New York City collided in midair with a TWA Lockheed L-1049 Super Constellation descending toward LaGuardia Airport. The Constellation crashed on Miller Field in Staten Island and the DC-8 in Park Slope, Brooklyn, killing all 128 aboard the two aircraft and six people on the ground. The accident, the world's deadliest aviation disaster at the time.

The accident became known as the Park Slope plane crash or the Miller Field crash after the two crash sites. The accident was also the first hull loss and first fatal accident involving a Douglas DC-8.

Aircraft and crews
United Airlines Flight 826, Mainliner Will Rogers, registration  was a DC-8-11 carrying 77 passengers and seven crewmembers from O'Hare International Airport in Chicago to Idlewild Airport (now John F. Kennedy International Airport) in Queens. The crew consisted of captain Robert Sawyer (age 46), first officer Robert Fiebing (40), flight engineer Richard Pruitt (30) and four stewardesses. Captain Sawyer was a highly experienced pilot, having accumulated 19,100 flight hours, of which 344 were in the DC-8. First officer Fiebing had accumulated 8,400 flight hours, of which 416 were in the DC-8. Flight engineer Pruitt had accumulated 8,500 flight hours, of which 379 were in the DC-8.

Trans World Airlines Flight 266, Star of Sicily, registration  was a Super Constellation carrying 39 passengers and five crew members from Dayton and Columbus, Ohio, to LaGuardia Airport in Queens. The crew consisted of captain David Wollam (age 39), first officer Dean Bowen (32), flight engineer LeRoy "Lee" Rosenthal (30) and two stewardesses. Captain Wollam had accumulated 14,583 flight hours, 267 of which were in the Constellation. First officer Bowen had accumulated 6,411 flight hours, of which 268 were on the Constellation. Flight engineer Rosenthal had accumulated 3,561 flight hours, of which 204 were in the Constellation. Star of Sicily sister ship N6902C, Star of the Seine, was destroyed in another mid-air collision with a United Airlines flight in 1956.

Background

At 10:21 a.m. Eastern Time, United 826 advised ARINC radio that one of its VOR receivers was inoperative, and the message was relayed to United Airlines maintenance. However, air-traffic control (ATC) was not informed that the aircraft had only one operational receiver, which presented difficulty for the pilots of flight 826 to identify the Preston intersection, beyond which it had not received clearance.

That clearance included holding instructions (a standard "racetrack" holding pattern) for Flight 826 when it arrived at the Preston intersection. However, the aircraft was estimated to be traveling at  when it collided with the TWA plane, several miles beyond the Preston clearance limit.

During the investigation, United Airlines claimed that the Colts Neck VOR was unreliable. Preston was the point where airway V123—the 050-radial off the Robbinsville VOR—crossed the Solberg 120-degree radial and the Colts Neck 346-degree radial. However, the Civil Aeronautics Board's final report found no problem with the Colts Neck VOR.

The prevailing conditions were light rain and fog, which had been preceded by snowfall.

Collision and ground impacts 

One of the DC-8's starboard engines struck the Constellation just ahead of its wings, tearing apart a portion of the fuselage. The Constellation entered a dive, with debris continuing to fall as it disintegrated during its spiral to the ground.

The initial impact tore the DC-8's engine from its pylon. Having lost one engine and a large part of the right wing, the DC-8 remained airborne for another 90 seconds.

The DC-8 crashed into the Park Slope section of Brooklyn at the intersection of Seventh Avenue and Sterling Place, scattering wreckage and setting fire to ten brownstone apartment buildings, the Pillar of Fire Church, the McCaddin Funeral Home, a Chinese laundry and a delicatessen. Six people on the ground were killed.

The crash left the remains of the DC-8 pointing southeast toward a large open field at Prospect Park, blocks from its crash site. An occupant in one of the affected apartment buildings said that his family survived because they were in the only room of their apartment that was not destroyed. The crash left a trench covering most of the length of the middle of Sterling Place. Witnesses thought that a bomb had detonated or that a building's boiler had exploded.

At least one passenger fell into a tree before the wreckage hit the ground.

There was no radio contact with traffic controllers from either plane after the collision, although LaGuardia had begun tracking an incoming, fast-moving, unidentified plane from Preston toward the LaGuardia "Flatbush" outer marker.

Investigation

The likely cause of the accident was identified in a report by the US Civil Aeronautics Board:

Initial survivor
The only person to initially survive the crash was Stephen Baltz, an 11-year-old boy from Wilmette, Illinois. He was traveling unaccompanied on Flight 826 to spend Christmas in Yonkers with relatives. He was thrown from the plane into a snowbank, where his burning clothing was extinguished. Although alive and conscious, he was severely burned and had inhaled burning fuel. Baltz died of pneumonia the next day.

Legacy
The total of 134 victims would not be surpassed until a Lockheed C-130B Hercules was shot down in May 1968, killing 155 people. In terms of commercial aviation, the death toll would not be surpassed until the March 1969 crash of Viasa Flight 742, which crashed on takeoff and killed all 84 people on board the aircraft, as well as 71 people on the ground.

In 2010, on the 50th anniversary of the accident, a memorial to the 134 victims of the two crashes was unveiled in Green-Wood Cemetery, Brooklyn. The cemetery is the site of the common grave containing the remains of those who could not be identified.

The collision is covered in "Collision Course," the fifth episode of the first season of The Weather Channel documentary series Why Planes Crash.

See also

List of accidents and incidents involving commercial aircraft
Jonas Kamlet, a chemist who died in the crash
1956 Grand Canyon mid-air collision, another mid-air collision, also involving United Airlines and Trans World Airlines aircraft

References

External links
 Pillar of Fire: Recalling the Day the Sky Fell, December 16, 1960 by Nathaniel Altman, from the Park Slope Reader
 U.S. Civil Aeronautics Board Aircraft Accident Report
 Accident description TWA Super Constellation L-1049 N6907C
 Accident description United Airlines DC-8-11 N8013U
 Pre-crash photo of N6907C
 Death in the Air, Time, 26 December 1960.
 Newsreel film footage of crash
 Nelson, Libby. "The Boy Who Survived a 1960 Midair Crash" (Archive). The New York Times. 30 June 2009.
 "127 die as 2 airliners collide over the city; jet sets Brooklyn fire, killing 5 others; the second plane crashes on Staten Island" (Archive). The New York Times. Vol CX. No. 37,583. Saturday 17 December 1960.
 Park Slope Plane Crash, City Room (The New York Times local news blog), Sunday, December 12–Thursday, December 16, 2010 – A series of articles about the aviation disaster.
 CNN photo gallery of the crash
 Deadly Brooklyn Plane Crash, 1960 – slideshow by Life magazine
Pillar of Fire – Interview with Dorothy M. Fletcher by Nathaniel Altman
Fate or fluke? Air crash sole survivors by Barry Neild for CNN

"1960 New York City plane crash: A look back". – slideshow by New York Daily News

New York mid-air collision
1960s in Brooklyn
New York mid-air collision
Mid-air collisions
Mid-air collisions involving airliners
Airliner accidents and incidents caused by pilot error
Airliner accidents and incidents in New York City
Accidents and incidents involving the Douglas DC-8
Accidents and incidents involving the Lockheed Constellation
Trans World Airlines accidents and incidents
New York mid-air collision
Park Slope
History of Staten Island
New York mid-air collision